The 1984–85 Southern Football League season was the 82nd in the history of the league, an English football competition.

Premier Division
The Premier Division consisted of 20 clubs, including 15 clubs from the previous season and five new clubs:
Two clubs promoted from the Midland Division:
Shepshed Charterhouse
Willenhall Town

Two clubs promoted from the Southern Division:
Crawley Town
Road-Sea Southampton

Plus:
Trowbridge Town, relegated from the Alliance Premier League

League table

Midland Division
The Midland Division consisted of 19 clubs, including 16 clubs from the previous season and three new clubs:
Hednesford Town, joined from the West Midlands (Regional) League
Stourbridge, relegated from the Premier Division
Sutton Coldfield Town, relegated from the Premier Division

League table

Southern Division
The Southern Division consisted of 20 clubs, including 17 clubs from the previous season and three new clubs:
Dorchester Town, relegated from the Premier Division
Gosport Borough, relegated from the Premier Division
Sheppey United, joined from the Kent Football League

Also, at the end of the previous season Hillingdon Borough was renamed Hillingdon.

At the end of the season Hillingdon merged with London Spartan League club Burnham to form a new club Burnham & Hillingdon, who took over a place in the Southern Football League.

League table

See also
Southern Football League
1984–85 Isthmian League
1984–85 Northern Premier League

References
RSSF – Southern Football League archive

Southern Football League seasons
6